Refik Memišević (14 May 1956 in Bačko Novo Selo – 4 January 2004 in Subotica) was a Yugoslav wrestler who competed in the 1980 Summer Olympics and in the 1984 Summer Olympics.

References

External links
 

1956 births
2004 deaths
Serbian male sport wrestlers
Olympic wrestlers of Yugoslavia
Wrestlers at the 1980 Summer Olympics
Wrestlers at the 1984 Summer Olympics
Yugoslav male sport wrestlers
Olympic silver medalists for Yugoslavia
Olympic medalists in wrestling
World Wrestling Championships medalists
Medalists at the 1984 Summer Olympics
Medalists at the 1981 Summer Universiade